HMIS Konkan (J228) was a s built for the Royal Navy, but transferred to the Royal Indian Navy (RIN) during the Second World War.

Design and description
The Bangor class was designed as a small minesweeper that could be easily built in large numbers by civilian shipyards; as steam turbines were difficult to manufacture, the ships were designed to accept a wide variety of engines. The ship's complement consisted of 60 officers and ratings.

She was powered by two vertical triple-expansion steam engines (VTE), each driving one shaft, using steam provided by two Admiralty three-drum boilers.

The VTE-powered Bangors were armed with a 12-pounder  anti-aircraft gun and a single QF 2-pounder (4 cm) AA gun or a quadruple mount for the Vickers .50 machine gun. In some ships the 2-pounder was replaced a single or twin  20 mm Oerlikon AA gun, while most ships were fitted with four additional single Oerlikon mounts over the course of the war. For escort work, their minesweeping gear could be exchanged for around 40 depth charges.

Construction and career
HMIS Konkan was ordered from Lobnitz & Co. originally for the Royal Navy as HMS Tilbury in 1940. However, before she was launched, she was transferred to the Royal Indian Navy and eventually commissioned as Konkan. The ship was a part of the Eastern Fleet, and escorted numerous convoys between Africa, British India and Australia in 1943-45.

According to the 1971-72 edition of Jane's Fighting Ships, INS KONKAN operated as part of the 31st Minesweeping Squadron and shows a photo of her sporting a '31' on the funnel and pennant number M 228. Two other Bangor class minesweepers were also operated by the Squadron until their retirement in 1960 - INS RAJPUTANA and ROHIKHAND. Three Australian built Bathurst class minesweepers - INS BENGAL (ret. 1967), INS BOMBAY (ret. 1962), and INS MADRAS (ret. 1962) were also part of the 31st Minesweeping Squadron. 
INS KONKAN was still listed on the Indian Navy list in the spring of 1971  and was disposed of in 1973

References

Bibliography
 

 

Bangor-class minesweepers of the Royal Indian Navy
1942 ships
Ships built on the River Clyde
World War II minesweepers of India